Germanus II Nauplius (? – June 1240) was Patriarch of Constantinople (in exile at Nicaea) from 1223 until his death in June 1240.

He was born at Anaplous in the second half of the 12th century. At the time of the Fourth Crusade in 1204, he served as a deacon in the Hagia Sophia; following the sack of Constantinople, he retired to a monastery at Achyraous.

In 1223, he was selected by the Nicaean emperor John III Vatatzes to fill the seat of the Ecumenical Patriarchate, which had relocated there after the fall of Constantinople. Germanus assumed the patriarchal throne on 4 January 1223, and quickly proved himself a valuable ally to Vatatzes. Throughout his patriarchate, Germanus strove to re-establish his authority as the head of the politically splintered Orthodox world, all the while supporting Vatatzes' in his claim to the Byzantine imperial inheritance. Thus Germanus clashed with the prelates of Epirus for their support of the Epirote rulers, and especially the Archbishop of Ohrid, Demetrios Chomatenos, who had presided over the coronation of Theodore Komnenos Doukas as emperor at Thessalonica, directly challenging Nicaea's position. After the Epirote defeat at Klokotnitsa in 1230 however, the Epirote bishops were gradually won over; in 1232, the schism was healed with the Epirote church recognizing his authority, followed by a tour of the region by Germanus in 1238.

By contrast, Germanus was willing to bow to political realities on the issue of the Bulgarian Church. In 1235, he convened a council in Lampsacus on the Hellespont that included Eastern Patriarchs, dignitaries from the Greek and Bulgarian churches, abbots from a number of monasteries including from Mount Athos. This Council recognized the Bulgarian Church as a junior patriarchate. In part this was the result of political necessity, as a condition for the alliance between Vatatzes and the Bulgarian tsar Ivan Asen II, but it was also seen a necessary move to detach the Bulgarian Church from its post-1204 submission to Rome. Similar motives lay behind his recognition of the autocephalous status of the Serbian Church.

Although a fierce critic of the perceived "errors" of the Catholic Church, and author of numerous anti-Catholic treatises, he was initially willing to a rapprochement with Rome. In 1232, he sent a group of Franciscans, with whose demeanor and desire for reconciliation he had been impressed, as envoys to the Pope. Germanus proposed the convening of a full ecumenical council, aiming at the reunion of the Churches. In response, a delegation of Franciscans and Dominicans arrived at Nicaea in 1234, but their remit was limited: they had no authority to conduct any negotiations, only to sound out the emperor and the patriarch. The Latin delegation attended a council held in Nymphaion, but it broke up in acrimony between the Greeks and Latins. The papal envoys fled back to Rome, while the Nicaeans went on to attack Constantinople.

References

Sources

External links
 Biography at the website of the Ecumenical Patriarchate of Constantinople  

12th-century births
1240 deaths
13th-century patriarchs of Constantinople
People of the Empire of Nicaea
13th-century Byzantine writers